Mark James "Slave" Williams (born 1971) and Otis Frizzell (born 1971) are a New Zealand duo known as hip hop MCs and television and radio presenters. Together they are known for their musical work in the 1990s as MC OJ & Rhythm Slave and Joint Force, and their radio and television work in later years.

As well as their work as a duo, each is known for his own achievements. Otis Frizzell, son of pop-artist Dick Frizzell,  is an internationally acclaimed artist, particularly for his work in graffiti art, sometimes under the name Opto. With his wife Sarah Frizzell, he also runs an acclaimed taco truck in Auckland. As MC Slave, Mark Williams produces and MCs with Wellington group Fat Freddy's Drop.

MC OJ & Rhythm Slave 

The duo's first creative collaboration was as hip hop duo MC OJ & Rhythm Slave, best known for their 1990 single "That's The Way (Positivity)", based around a sample from "That's the Way (I Like It)" by KC and the Sunshine Band. The pair met at Selwyn College in the late '80s and started performing together, playing at house parties and getting minor gigs.  They were signed to Murray Cammick's Southside Records and released their first single, "That's The Way (Positivity)" in 1990, reaching #12 in the charts. Further singles included "Money Worries" with guest vocals from Push Push frontman Mikey Havoc; and safe sex anthem "Body Rhymes (Protect Yourself)" with guest vocals from Teremoana Rapley of Moana and the Moahunters.

Joint Force 

In the mid 1990s, Mark and Otis teamed up with DJ and producer DLT of Upper Hutt Posse and formed the hip hop group Joint Force. They released the One Inch Punch EP in 1995 on BMG records. The trio (along with director Josh Frizzell) also made an ambitious two-part video for their single "Static", that was nominated for Best Music Video at the 1996 New Zealand Music Awards.  With the track remixed by Mario Caldato, Jr., "Static (part 1)" was based around a stylish, Tarantino-inspired crime drama, with little focus on the song itself. "Static (part 2)" was a basic video of the trio performing the song in a dark studio.

This was the duo's last project as hip hop performers, though the pair remained active in the New Zealand hip hop community. Slave produced the 1998 compilation album Aotearoa Hip Hop Vol 1 and was a regular host of the Aotearoa hip hop summit.

Radio 

In 1994, Slave was approached by bFM radio station manager Graeme Hill to put together a weekly hip hop show, along with DJ Sir-Vere, Bass and DLT. This became the long-running True School Hip Hop Show.  Together Mark and Otis were the long-running hosts of their radio show Slave and Otis, the Wednesday Drive show on bFM. In 2004 the duo moved to host the breakfast show on Auckland station Base FM.

Mo' Show 

From 2001 to 2003, Mark and Otis starred in their own TV series, Mo' Show on TV2. Inspired by hip hop culture, the duo travelled around the world with digital cameras, exploring places and meeting interesting and creative people, including celebrities. The series was nominated for Best Entertainment Series at the 2002 New Zealand Television Awards, and won in the same category at the 2003 awards.

Other work 

At the 2014 New Zealand Music Awards, Slave and Otis presented the Legacy Award to funk-rock group Supergroove.

Discography

Albums as MC OJ & Rhythm Slave

Singles as MC OJ & Rhythm Slave

EPs as Joint Force

Singles as Joint Force

Awards

|-
| rowspan="2" | 1992
| MC OJ & Rhythm Slave - What Can We Say?
| 1992 NZ Music Awards - Album of the Year
|  
|-
| Dick Frizzell - What Can We Say?
| 1992 NZ Music Awards - Best Cover
|  
|-
| rowspan="3" | 1996
| Otis Frizzell
| 1996 NZ Music Awards - Most Promising Male Vocalist
| 
|-
| Joint Force
| 1996 NZ Music Awards - Most Promising Group
| 
|-
| M Noonan and J Frizzell - "Static (Part 1)"
| 1996 NZ Music Awards - Best Video
| 
|-
| 2002
| Mo' Show
| 2002 NZ Television Awards - Best Entertainment Series 
|  
|-
| 2003
| Mo' Show
| 2003 NZ Television Awards - Best Entertainment Series 
|  
|-
| 2009
| Otis Frizzell - Dr Boondigga and the Big BW
| 2009 NZ Music Awards - Best Cover
|  
|}

External links 
 MC OJ and Rhythm Slave profile at Audio Culture

References 

New Zealand radio presenters
New Zealand television presenters
New Zealand hip hop groups
People educated at Selwyn College, Auckland